The following is a list of Wahlenbergia species recognised by the World Checklist of Selected Plant Families as at January 2019:
 
 Wahlenbergia abyssinica (Hochst. ex A.Rich.)
 Wahlenbergia abyssinica subsp. abyssinica
 Wahlenbergia abyssinica subsp. parvipetala Thulin
 Wahlenbergia acaulis E.Mey. ex A.DC. in A.P.de Candolle
 Wahlenbergia acicularis Brehmer
 Wahlenbergia acuminata Brehmer
 Wahlenbergia adamsonii Lammers
 Wahlenbergia adpressa (L.f.) Sond.
 Wahlenbergia akaroa J.A.Petterson
 Wahlenbergia albens (Spreng. ex A.DC.) Lammers
 Wahlenbergia albicaulis (Sond.) Lammers
 Wahlenbergia albomarginata Hook.
 Wahlenbergia albomarginata subsp. albomarginata
 Wahlenbergia albomarginata subsp. decora J.A.Petterson
 Wahlenbergia albomarginata subsp. flexilis (Petrie) J.A.Petterson
 Wahlenbergia albomarginata subsp. laxa (G.Simpson) J.A.Petterson
 Wahlenbergia albomarginata subsp. olivina J.A.Petterson
 Wahlenbergia androsacea A.DC.
 Wahlenbergia androsacea var. multicaulis Brehmer
 Wahlenbergia angustifolia (Roxb.) A.DC.
 Wahlenbergia annua (A.DC.) Thulin
 Wahlenbergia annularis A.DC. in A.P.de Candolle
 Wahlenbergia annuliformis Brehmer
 Wahlenbergia appressifolia Hilliard & B.L.Burtt
 Wahlenbergia arcta Thulin
 Wahlenbergia aridicola P.J.Sm.
 Wahlenbergia asparagoides (Adamson) Lammers
 Wahlenbergia asperifolia Brehmer
 Wahlenbergia axillaris (Sond.) Lammers
 Wahlenbergia banksiana A.DC.
 Wahlenbergia berteroi Hook. & Arn.
 Wahlenbergia bolusiana Schltr. & Brehmer
 Wahlenbergia bowkeriae Sond.
 Wahlenbergia brachiata (Adamson) Lammers
 Wahlenbergia brachycarpa Schltr.
 Wahlenbergia brachyphylla (Adamson) Lammers
 Wahlenbergia brasiliensis Cham.
 Wahlenbergia brehmeri Lammers
 Wahlenbergia brevisquamifolia Brehmer
 Wahlenbergia buseriana Schltr. & Brehmer
 Wahlenbergia calcarea (Adamson) Lammers
 Wahlenbergia calycina Schltdl. ex Griseb.
 Wahlenbergia campanuloides (Delile) Vatke
 Wahlenbergia candolleana (Hiern) Thulin
 Wahlenbergia candollei Tuyn
 Wahlenbergia capensis (L.) A.DC.
 Wahlenbergia capillacea (L.f.) A.DC.
 Wahlenbergia capillacea subsp. capillacea
 Wahlenbergia capillacea subsp. tenuior (Engl.) Thulin
 Wahlenbergia capillaris (G.Lodd.) G.Don in R.Sweet – tufted bluebell
 Wahlenbergia capillata Brehmer
 Wahlenbergia capillifolia E.Mey. ex Brehmer
 Wahlenbergia capitata (Baker) Thulin
 Wahlenbergia cartilaginea Hook.f.
 Wahlenbergia caryophylloides P.J.Sm.
 Wahlenbergia celata P.I.Forst.
 Wahlenbergia cephalodina Thulin
 Wahlenbergia ceracea Lothian – waxy bluebell
 Wahlenbergia cerastioides Thulin
 Wahlenbergia cernua (Thunb.) A.DC.
 Wahlenbergia cinerea (L.f.) Lammers
 Wahlenbergia clavata Brehmer
 Wahlenbergia collomioides (A.DC.) Thulin
 Wahlenbergia compacta Brehmer
 Wahlenbergia confusa Merr. & L.M.Perry
 Wahlenbergia congesta (Cheeseman) N.E.Br.
 Wahlenbergia congesta subsp. congesta
 Wahlenbergia congesta subsp. haastii J.A.Petterson
 Wahlenbergia congestifolia Brehmer
 Wahlenbergia constricta Brehmer
 Wahlenbergia cooperi Brehmer
 Wahlenbergia cordata (Adamson) Lammers
 Wahlenbergia costata A.DC. in A.P.de Candolle
 Wahlenbergia cuspidata Brehmer
 Wahlenbergia debilis H.Buek in C.F.Ecklon & K.L.P.Zeyher
 Wahlenbergia decipiens A.DC. in A.P.de Candolle
 Wahlenbergia densicaulis Brehmer
 Wahlenbergia densicaulis var. angusta Brehmer
 Wahlenbergia densifolia Lothian – fairy bluebell
 Wahlenbergia dentata Brehmer
 Wahlenbergia denticulata (Burch.) A.DC.
 Wahlenbergia denudata A.DC.
 Wahlenbergia depressa J.M.Wood & M.S.Evans
 Wahlenbergia desmantha Lammers
 Wahlenbergia dichotoma A.DC. in A.P.de Candolle
 Wahlenbergia dieterlenii (E.Phillips) Lammers
 Wahlenbergia dilatata Brehmer
 Wahlenbergia distincta Brehmer
 Wahlenbergia divergens A.DC. in A.P.de Candolle
 Wahlenbergia doleritica Hilliard & B.L.Burtt
 Wahlenbergia dunantii A.DC.
 Wahlenbergia ecklonii H.Buek in C.F.Ecklon & K.L.P.Zeyher
 Wahlenbergia effusa (Adamson) Lammers
 Wahlenbergia epacridea Sond.
 Wahlenbergia erecta (Roth ex Schult.) Tuyn
 Wahlenbergia ericoidella (P.A.Duvign. & Denaeyer) Thulin
 Wahlenbergia erophiloides Markgr.
 Wahlenbergia exilis A.DC.
 Wahlenbergia fasciculata Brehmer
 Wahlenbergia fernandeziana A.DC.
 Wahlenbergia filipes Brehmer
 Wahlenbergia fistulosa Brehmer
 Wahlenbergia flexuosa (Hook.f. & Thomson) Thulin
 Wahlenbergia floribunda Schltr. & Brehmer
 Wahlenbergia fluminalis (J.M.Black) E.Wimm. ex H.Eichler – river bluebell
 Wahlenbergia fruticosa Brehmer
 Wahlenbergia galpiniae Schltr.
 Wahlenbergia glabra P.J.Sm.
 Wahlenbergia glandulifera Brehmer
 Wahlenbergia globularis E.Wimm.
 Wahlenbergia gloriosa Lothian – royal bluebell
 Wahlenbergia gracilenta Lothian – annual bluebell
 Wahlenbergia gracilis (G.Forst.) A.DC. – sprawling bluebell, Australian bluebell
 Wahlenbergia grahamiae Hemsl.
 Wahlenbergia grandiflora Brehmer
 Wahlenbergia graniticola Carolin
 Wahlenbergia hirsuta (Edgew.) Tuyn
 Wahlenbergia hookeri (C.B.Clarke) Tuyn
 Wahlenbergia humbertii Thulin
 Wahlenbergia huttonii (Sond.) Thulin
 Wahlenbergia ingrata A.DC. in A.P.de Candolle
 Wahlenbergia insulae-howei Lothian
 Wahlenbergia intermedia Zahlbr.
 Wahlenbergia islensis P.J.Sm.
 Wahlenbergia juncea (H.Buek) Lammers
 Wahlenbergia kowiensis R.A.Dyer
 Wahlenbergia krebsii Cham.
 Wahlenbergia krebsii subsp. arguta (Hook.f.) Thulin
 Wahlenbergia krebsii subsp. krebsii
 Wahlenbergia lasiocarpa Schltr. & Brehmer
 Wahlenbergia laxiflora (Sond.) Lammers
 Wahlenbergia levynsiae Lammers
 Wahlenbergia linarioides (Lam.) A.DC.
 Wahlenbergia linifolia (Roxb.) A.DC.
 Wahlenbergia littoralis (Labill.) Sweet
 Wahlenbergia littoricola P.J.Sm.
 Wahlenbergia lobelioides (L.f.) Link
 Wahlenbergia lobelioides subsp. lobelioides
 Wahlenbergia lobelioides subsp. nutabunda (Guss.) Murb.
 Wahlenbergia lobelioides subsp. riparia (A.DC.) Thulin
 Wahlenbergia lobulata Brehmer
 Wahlenbergia loddigesii (A.DC.) I.M.Turner
 Wahlenbergia longifolia (A.DC.) Lammers
 Wahlenbergia longisquamifolia Brehmer
 Wahlenbergia luteola P.J.Sm.
 Wahlenbergia lycopodioides Schltr. & Brehmer
 Wahlenbergia macrostachys (A.DC.) Lammers
 Wahlenbergia madagascariensis A.DC.
 Wahlenbergia magaliesbergensis Lammers
 Wahlenbergia malaissei Thulin
 Wahlenbergia marginata (Thunb.) A.DC.
 Wahlenbergia marunguensis Thulin
 Wahlenbergia masafuerae (Phil.) Skottsb.
 Wahlenbergia massonii A.DC.
 Wahlenbergia matthewsii Cockayne
 Wahlenbergia melanops Goldblatt & J.C.Manning
 Wahlenbergia meyeri A.DC. in A.P.de Candolle
 Wahlenbergia microphylla (Adamson) Lammers
 Wahlenbergia minuta Brehmer
 Wahlenbergia mollis Brehmer
 Wahlenbergia multicaulis Benth. in S.L.Endlicher & al.
 Wahlenbergia namaquana Sond.
 Wahlenbergia nana Brehmer
 Wahlenbergia napiformis (A.DC.) Thulin
 Wahlenbergia neorigida Lammers
 Wahlenbergia neostricta Lammers
 Wahlenbergia nodosa (H.Buek) Lammers
 Wahlenbergia obovata Brehmer
 Wahlenbergia oligantha Lammers
 Wahlenbergia oligotricha Schltr. & Brehmer
 Wahlenbergia oocarpa Sond.
 Wahlenbergia orae Lammers
 Wahlenbergia oxyphylla A.DC. in A.P.de Candolle
 Wahlenbergia pallidiflora Hilliard & B.L.Burtt
 Wahlenbergia paludicola Thulin
 Wahlenbergia paniculata (L.f.) A.DC.
 Wahlenbergia papuana P.Royen
 Wahlenbergia parvifolia (P.J.Bergius) Lammers
 Wahlenbergia patula A.DC. in A.P.de Candolle
 Wahlenbergia paucidentata Schinz
 Wahlenbergia paucidentata var. tysonii Schinz
 Wahlenbergia pauciflora A.DC. in A.P.de Candolle
 Wahlenbergia peduncularis Wall. ex A.DC.) Hook.f. & Thomson
 Wahlenbergia perrieri Thulin
 Wahlenbergia perrottetii (A.DC.) Thulin
 Wahlenbergia persimilis Thulin
 Wahlenbergia peruviana A.Gray
 Wahlenbergia petraea Thulin
 Wahlenbergia pilosa H.Buek in C.F.Ecklon & K.L.P.Zeyher
 Wahlenbergia pinifolia N.E.Br.
 Wahlenbergia pinnata Compton
 Wahlenbergia planiflora P.J.Sm.
 Wahlenbergia planiflora subsp. longipila Carolin ex P.J.Sm.
 Wahlenbergia planiflora subsp. planiflora
 Wahlenbergia planifolia Gand.
 Wahlenbergia polyantha Lammers
 Wahlenbergia polycephala (Mildbr.) Thulin
 Wahlenbergia polyclada A.DC. in A.P.de Candolle
 Wahlenbergia polyphylla Thulin
 Wahlenbergia polytrichifolia Schltr.
 Wahlenbergia polytrichifolia subsp. dracomontana Hilliard & B.L.Burtt
 Wahlenbergia polytrichifolia subsp. polytrichifolia
 Wahlenbergia preissii de Vriese in J.G.C.Lehmann
 Wahlenbergia procumbens (L.f.) A.DC.
 Wahlenbergia prostrata E.Mey. ex A.DC. in A.P.de Candolle
 Wahlenbergia psammophila Schltr.
 Wahlenbergia pseudoandrosacea Brehmer
 Wahlenbergia pseudoinhambanensis Brehmer
 Wahlenbergia pseudonudicaulis Brehmer
 Wahlenbergia pulchella Thulin
 Wahlenbergia pulchella subsp. laurentii Thulin
 Wahlenbergia pulchella subsp. mbalensis Thulin
 Wahlenbergia pulchella subsp. michelii Thulin
 Wahlenbergia pulchella subsp. paradoxa Thulin
 Wahlenbergia pulchella subsp. pedicellata Thulin
 Wahlenbergia pulchella subsp. pulchella
 Wahlenbergia pulvillus-gigantis Hilliard & B.L.Burtt
 Wahlenbergia pusilla Hochst. ex A.Rich.
 Wahlenbergia pygmaea Colenso
 Wahlenbergia pygmaea subsp. drucei J.A.Petterson
 Wahlenbergia pygmaea subsp. pygmaea
 Wahlenbergia pygmaea subsp. tararua J.A.Petterson
 Wahlenbergia pyrophila Lammers
 Wahlenbergia quadrifida (R.Br.) A.DC.
 Wahlenbergia queenslandica Carolin ex P.J.Sm.
 Wahlenbergia ramifera Brehmer
 Wahlenbergia ramosa G.Simpson
 Wahlenbergia ramosissima (Hemsl.) Thulin
 Wahlenbergia ramosissima subsp. centiflora Thulin
 Wahlenbergia ramosissima subsp. lateralis (Brehmer) Thulin
 Wahlenbergia ramosissima subsp. oldeniandioides Thulin
 Wahlenbergia ramosissima subsp. ramosissima.
 Wahlenbergia ramosissima subsp. richardsiae Thulin
 Wahlenbergia ramosissima subsp. subcapitata Thulin
 Wahlenbergia ramosissima subsp. zambiensis Thulin
 Wahlenbergia rara Schltr. & Brehmer
 Wahlenbergia rhytidosperma Thulin
 Wahlenbergia riversdalensis Lammers
 Wahlenbergia rivularis Diels
 Wahlenbergia roelliflora Schltr. & Brehmer
 Wahlenbergia roxburghii A.DC.
 Wahlenbergia rubens (H.Buek) Lammers
 Wahlenbergia rubioides (A.DC.) Lammers
 Wahlenbergia rupestris G.Simpson
 Wahlenbergia rupicola G.T.Plunkett & J.J.Bruhl
 Wahlenbergia saxicola (R.Br.) A.DC.
 Wahlenbergia schistacea Brehmer
 Wahlenbergia schlechteri Brehmer
 Wahlenbergia schwackeana Zahlbr.
 Wahlenbergia scopella Brehmer
 Wahlenbergia scopulicola Carolin ex P.J.Sm.
 Wahlenbergia scottii Thulin
 Wahlenbergia serpentina Brehmer
 Wahlenbergia sessiliflora Brehmer
 Wahlenbergia silenoides Hochst. ex A.Rich.
 Wahlenbergia sonderi Lammers
 Wahlenbergia songeana Thulin
 Wahlenbergia sphaerica Brehmer
 Wahlenbergia squamifolia Brehmer
 Wahlenbergia squarrosa Brehmer
 Wahlenbergia stellarioides Cham.
 Wahlenbergia stricta (R.Br.) Sweet
 Wahlenbergia stricta subsp. alterna P.J.Sm.
 Wahlenbergia stricta subsp. stricta Wahlenbergia subaphylla (Baker) Thulin
 Wahlenbergia subaphylla subsp. scoparia (Wild) Thulin
 Wahlenbergia subaphylla subsp. subaphylla Wahlenbergia subaphylla subsp. thesioides Thulin
 Wahlenbergia subfusiformis Brehmer
 Wahlenbergia subpilosa Brehmer
 Wahlenbergia subrosulata Brehmer
 Wahlenbergia subtilis Brehmer
 Wahlenbergia subulata (L'Hér.) Lammers
 Wahlenbergia subumbellata Markgr.
 Wahlenbergia suffruticosa Cupido
 Wahlenbergia telfordii G.T.Plunkett & J.J.Bruhl
 Wahlenbergia tenella (L.f.) Lammers
 Wahlenbergia tenuiloba Thulin
 Wahlenbergia tenuis A.DC. in A.P.de Candolle
 Wahlenbergia tetramera Thulin
 Wahlenbergia thulinii Lammers
 Wahlenbergia thunbergiana (H.Buek) Lammers
 Wahlenbergia thunbergii (Schult.) B.Nord.
 Wahlenbergia tibestica Quézel
 Wahlenbergia tomentosula Brehmer
 Wahlenbergia tortilis Brehmer
 Wahlenbergia transvaalensis Brehmer
 Wahlenbergia tsaratananae Thulin
 Wahlenbergia tuberosa Hook.f.
 Wahlenbergia tumida Brehmer
 Wahlenbergia tumidifructa P.J.Sm.
 Wahlenbergia umbellata (Adamson) Lammers
 Wahlenbergia undulata (L.f.) A.DC.
 Wahlenbergia unidentata (L.f.) Lammers
 Wahlenbergia upembensis Thulin
 Wahlenbergia urcosensis E.Wimm.
 Wahlenbergia verbascoides Thulin
 Wahlenbergia vernicosa J.A.Petterson
 Wahlenbergia victoriensis P.J.Sm.
 Wahlenbergia violacea J.A.Petterson
 Wahlenbergia virgata Engl.
 Wahlenbergia virgulta Brehmer
 Wahlenbergia welwitschii (A.DC.) Thulin
 Wahlenbergia wittei Thulin
 Wahlenbergia wyleyana'' Sond.

References

Wahlenbergia